Rajendra Nagar or Rajendranagar is the name of several localities and towns in India, most of them named after the country's first president Rajendra Prasad. It may refer to:

 Rajendranagar Terminal, serving Patna, Bihar
Rajendranagar mandal, in Ranga Reddy District, Telangana
 Rajendra Nagar, Delhi, a residential neighborhood in Central Delhi, India
 Rajendra Nagar, Raxaul, a residential area near railway station, Raxaul, Bihar
 Rajendra Nagar, Indore
 Rajendra Nagar, Patna
Rajendranagar (Assembly constituency), in Telangana
 Ghaziabad, India, a planned industrial city in the Indian state of Uttar Pradesh
 A locality in Lucknow
 A locality in Hyderabad
 A locality in Gwalior (Madhya Pradesh)
 A locality in Mysore